Jeonju Chu clan is one of the Korean clans. Their Bon-gwan was in Jeonju, North Jeolla Province. According to the research held in 2015, the number of Jeonju Chu clan was 49017. Their founder was  who worked as Munha sijung (門下侍中) in Song dynasty during Emperor Gaozong of Song’s reign in 1141.  joined the Japanese invasions of Korea war with his son, Chu Ro and Chu Jeok, because he was ordered by Wanli Emperor. , Chu Ro, and Chu Jeok fought with the 5000 soldiers and went over Yalu River. They made some achievements during Japanese invasions of Korea, but they settled in Jeonju without coming back their home. All of their descendants were the member of Jeonju Chu clan.

See also 
 Korean clan names of foreign origin

References

External links 
 

 
Korean clan names of Chinese origin
Chu clans